The 1936 French Grand Prix (formally the XXX Grand Prix de l'Automobile Club de France) was a Grand Prix motor race which was held at Montlhéry, France on 28 June 1936. The race was held over 80 laps of the 12.5 km course for a total distance of 1000 km. The race was won by Jean-Pierre Wimille and Raymond Sommer driving a Bugatti. 

Due to national outcry as a result of the 1935 Grand Prix where just one French car started which was uncompetitive and failed to finish, it was decided that for 1936 the race should be held as an endurance race for sports cars, with rules very similar to the 24 Hours of Le Mans, and featured a Le Mans start. All 37 cars had two drivers, and were divided into 3 groups based on engine capacity: Group I for 0.75L to 2.0L, Group II for 2.0L to 4.0L, and Group III for over 4.0L.

Many entrants considered this race to be a replacement for the cancelled 1936 24 Hours of Le Mans.

Classification

Fastest Lap: René Dreyfus, 5m36.0

References 

French Grand Prix
French Grand Prix
Grand Prix
1936 in French motorsport